Hounslow tube station could refer to one of a number of London Underground stations serving the Hounslow area of west London:

 Hounslow East
 Hounslow Central
 Hounslow West

A closed station, Hounslow Town, was located at the eastern end of Hounslow High Street.

See also
 Hounslow railway station, a National Rail station in the same district

Disambig-Class London Transport articles